The Pictish Chronicle is a name used to refer to a pseudo-historical account of the kings of the Picts beginning many thousand years before history was recorded in Pictavia and ending after Pictavia had been enveloped by Scotland.

Version A

There are actually several versions of the Pictish Chronicle. The so-called "A" text is probably the oldest, the fullest, and seems to have fewer errors than other versions. The original (albeit lost) manuscript seems to date from the early years of the reign of Kenneth II of Scotland (who ruled Scotland from 971 until 995) since he is the last king mentioned and the chronicler does not know the length of his reign. This chronicle survives only in the 14th century Poppleton Manuscript.

It is in three parts:

 Cronica de origine antiquorum Pictorum, an account of the origins of the Picts, mostly from the Etymologies of Isidore of Seville.
 A list of Pictish kings.
 Chronicle of the Kings of Alba.

It is evident that the latter two sections were originally written in Gaelic since a few Gaelic words have not been translated into Latin.

Version D

By the 12th century, Giric had acquired legendary status as liberator of the Scottish church from Pictish oppression and, fantastically, as conqueror of Ireland and most of England. As a result, Giric was known as Gregory the Great (Giric's conquests appear as Bernicia, rather than Ireland (Hibernia), in some versions).

This tale appears in the variant of the Chronicle of the Kings of Alba which is interpolated in Andrew of Wyntoun's Orygynale Cronykil of Scotland.

This says that Áed reigned one year and was killed by his successor Giric in Strathallan (Other king lists have the same report).

Here Giric, or Grig, is named "Makdougall", son of Dúngal.

List "D", which may be taken as typical, contains this account of Giric:Giric, Dungal's son, reigned for twelve years; and he died in Dundurn, and was buried in Iona. He subdued to himself all Ireland, and nearly [all] England; and he was the first to give liberty to the Scottish church, which was in servitude up to that time, after the custom and fashion of the Picts.

This account is not found in the Poppleton Manuscript. The lists known as "D", "F", "I", "K", and "N", contain this version and is copied by the Chronicle of Melrose.

The Latin material interpolated in Andrew of Wyntoun's Orygynale Cronykl states that King Dub was murdered at Forres, and links this to an eclipse of the sun which can be dated to 20 July 966.

See also
 The Prophecy of Berchán
 Duan Albanach
 Senchus fer n-Alban
 Chronicle of the Kings of Alba
 Annals of Ulster
 List of Kings of the Picts

Bibliography
 A.O. Anderson: Early Sources of Scottish History (Vol. I) (1922)
 M.O. Anderson: Kings & Kingship in Early Scotland (1973)
 H.M. Chadwick: Early Scotland (1949)
 B.T. Hudson: Kings of Celtic Scotland (1994)

References

External links
 Annals of Tigernach
 The Pictish Chronicle: Text and translation at the Wayback Machine, archived from The Pictish Chronicle: Text and translation

Pictish culture
Scottish chronicles
Medieval Scottish literature
10th-century Latin books
10th-century Latin writers